Associazione Calcio Fiorentina enjoyed its best season in the 1990s on the pitch, but was left wondering what might have been. Leading the domestic Serie A championship a long way into the season, Fiorentina's title charge fell to pieces, as it lost unnecessary points while eventual champions Milan and runners-up Lazio continued winning their matches. In the end, Fiorentina salvaged third place in the league, qualifying for the UEFA Champions League in 1999–2000.

Its European adventure in 1998–99 however, ended early, when a handmade bomb was thrown at a linesman in the victory against Swiss side Grasshoppers. The linesman escaped serious injury, but Fiorentina were declared losers of the match, despite its victory on the pitch, and were thus thrown out of the tournament. However, it avoided further sanctions. Fiorentina also lost the Coppa Italia Final to Parma, marking another season without titles.

Several players were impressive, with the trio Gabriel Batistuta, Rui Costa and Francesco Toldo being the players really standing out. The defensive line-up and the many goals conceded were the main reasons Fiorentina would not win the title.

Players

Transfers

Competitions

Serie A

League table

Results summary

Results by round

Matches

Coppa Italia

Round of 32

Eightfinals

Quarterfinals

Semifinals

Final

UEFA Cup

First round

Second round

Other matches and friendlies

Statistics

Players statistics

Goalscorers
  Gabriel Batistuta 27
  Rui Costa 9 (3)
  Edmundo 8

References

ACF Fiorentina seasons
Fiorentina